The Lebanon national football team has used footballers born outside Lebanon throughout its history with varying success.

As a result of the dominance of clubs founded by the Armenian diaspora in Lebanon, between the 1940s and 1960s the national team heavily featured Lebanese players of Armenian origin. The established presence of Armenians in the team led the Lebanese Football Association (LFA) to naturalise several Armenian players born in Armenia during the 1990s to play internationally for Lebanon. Most notably, Vardan Ghazaryan was the national team's leading top goalscorer.

In preparation for the 2000 AFC Asian Cup, the LFA naturalised five Brazilian-born players of Lebanese descent; their presence was generally not well received, as it was felt that they did not improve the level of the team. Lebanon were eliminated in the first round without registering a single win. At the 2019 Asian Cup, nine of the 23 called-up players were born outside Lebanon; contrary to 2000, their inclusion was seen positively.

History

Armenians in Lebanon 

Following the Armenian genocide in 1915, many Armenians emigrated to Lebanon; as of 2021, Lebanon was home to the eighth-largest Armenian diaspora in the world. Between the 1940s and 1960s, clubs founded by the Armenian diaspora, such as Homenetmen and Homenmen, dominated in Lebanese domestic football; during this period many Lebanese players of Armenian origin played for the Lebanon national team.

The large presence of Armenians in Lebanon pushed the Lebanese Football Association (LFA) to naturalise Armenian players born outside of Lebanon. In 1993, the LFA naturalised Babken Melikyan via a presidential decree, ratified by Prime Minister Rafic Hariri, in order to play for the Lebanon national team at the 1994 FIFA World Cup qualification. Jamal Taha, born in Egypt to an Egyptian father and Lebanese mother, was also naturalised alongside Melikyan. Melikyan's example set the trend for other Armenian players to take advantage of the decree to gain citizenship and play for Lebanon during the 1990s, such as Gurgen Engibaryan, Gevorg Karapetyan and Armen Igitbashyan. The most impactful Armenian to play for the national team was Vardan Ghazaryan; he obtained Lebanese citizenship through naturalisation in 1994, and was the national team's top goalscorer.

After Homenetmen and Homenmen were relegated to the lower divisions in the early 2000s, the Armenian presence in the national team fell. Since 2006, no Lebanese of Armenian origin has featured for the national team, with the last Armenian player to represent "the Cedars" being Agop Donabidian.

2000 AFC Asian Cup 
With over six million people worldwide having Lebanese descent, compared to the four million Lebanese living in Lebanon, the LFA sought to take advantage of the sizeable Lebanese diaspora to improve football in Lebanon. Despite the positive impact of the Lebanese diaspora in various sports – such as basketball, tennis and rugby – football did not initially benefit in the same way.

In Lebanon's first participation at the AFC Asian Cup in 2000, which they hosted, they called up five Brazilian players of Lebanese heritage: Luís Fernandes, Gilberto, Jadir Morgenstern, Marcílio and Newton. According to Jamal Taha, Lebanon's captain at the tournament, there was no communication between the local players and the naturalised players due to the language barrier. Lebanon were eventually knocked out in the first round, without winning a single match.

The general sentiment regarding the Brazilian players was that they did not improve the level of the national team, and were in fact "harmful" due to the lack of integration with the other players.

Recent history 

At the 2019 Asian Cup, Lebanon's second participation, nine of the 23 players called up were born outside Lebanon. Compared to the 2000 Asian Cup, the addition of foreign-born players of Lebanese descent was well received: Hassan Maatouk, captain of the national team, stated: "It's a good thing for us that we have some players from outside the country that can come and help us and as a team." Several players born outside Lebanon communicated with their teammates in English.

Lebanon continued the trend of calling up players born abroad during the 2022 FIFA World Cup qualification campaign, in which the team reached the final round of qualifying for the second time. Wael Chehayeb of the LFA stated: "[People with Lebanese origins] give us more options when looking for players as we don't have a big population, and some of them have a European football education which is good for us."

List of players
This is a list of football players who represented the Lebanon national football team in international football and were born outside Lebanon.

The following players:
have played at least one game for the full (senior male) Lebanon national team; and
were born outside Lebanon.

This list includes players who have dual citizenship with Lebanon and/or have become naturalised Lebanese citizens. The players are ordered per modern-day country of birth; if the country at the time of birth differs from the current, this is indicated with a footnote.

List of countries

See also
 List of Lebanon international footballers
 List of Lebanon women's international footballers

Notes

References

 
Lebanon
Association football player non-biographical articles
Lebanon
Lebanese diaspora
Lebanon
Lists of Lebanon international footballers